Soundararajan Bangarusamy  is an Indian businessman who is the managing director of Suguna Holdings Private Limited (SHPL), the holding company for the Suguna group of companies. The group is among the most renowned groups in India. He is the elder son of the Bangarusamy and Kamalam and the brother of Sundararajan Bangarusamy.

Early life

Soundararajan Bagarusamy was born on 12 April 1961 to Bangarusamy and Kamalam. He has a younger brother, Sundararajan Bangarusamy and a younger sister Manomani. He was born and brought up in Ganapathipalayam, a small village located 70 km south of Coimbatore, Tamil Nadu. His parents used to teach in the government school in the village which had classes till high school. In 1978, when he finished his higher secondary, his father Bangarusamy suggested that he start something of his own. Bangarusamy felt that if his continued on to college and graduate, he would get himself a safe, comfortable job and would never start anything on his own. As a teacher, Bangarusamy knew the limited earnings a salaried job could provide and did not wish the same for him.

Since they had 20 acres of ancestral agricultural land, he decided to venture into farming. However, instead of growing cotton, a crop most villagers planted, he focused on vegetables because he wanted to do something different. His parents lent him money to get started. For the next three years, he did vegetable farming. It was not profitable. In fact, he incurred huge losses. With debt piling up, he decided to join his cousin's Agri-motor manufacturing company in Hyderabad. His cousin's company manufactured motors in Coimbatore and wanted to set up distribution and marketing channels in Andhra Pradesh and other states. He travelled across Andhra Pradesh and Maharashtra to sell these products.

Business career

In 1983, after working for three years in his cousin's company, he cleared his debts. He returned to the village right after. He had entrusted the farm to his younger brother, G. B. Sundararajan. By then, his brother had ideas to take their farming activities further. His brother wanted to venture into the poultry business. He joined him. His mother provided them Rs 5,000 for their business.
 
In 1986, they began our poultry trading firm. They would buy feed from the manufacturers, chicks from the hatcheries and supply them to farmers. They did brisk business for a few years but by the turn of the decade, the returns started diminishing. It was a sluggish market. They had an outstanding revenue of  Rs 8-10 lakhs. But the farmers who owed them were struggling, and they could not collect much from them.

The idea of contract farming began to take shape around this time. Instead of cash, they thought the farmers could repay their debts to them in service. They mapped the whole agricultural market process and found they were unable to make money because there were 14 cost centers and several middlemen who ate into their profits. Every time one more link was introduced in the process, margins dipped by five percent. They thought they could devise a system which would reduce the cost center from 14 to just four.

So, they launched the contract farming model with three farmers from their village. They provided the farmers with the feed, chicks and vaccines. Farmers only had to invest in infrastructure. They took away all input costs from them, and after 40 days, they bought the chicks from them to sell in the market. This way, the farmers received a steady income every month. It took them around three years to recover the outstanding amount from the farmers.

Gradually other farmers saw the benefits of the model and wanted to join in. Till 1997, they continued to work this way. They made satisfactory profits but in hindsight, it was a business driven by the need to survive. They only realized the potential of the business in 1997 when the company began generating about Rs 7 crore in turnover. They had 30 people on the payroll and about 35 farmers on contract. They realized that we had to bring in professional managers to help them grow further.

Hiring the right people enabled them to set up branches across Tamil Nadu. Within the next three years, their revenues jumped to Rs 100 crore, and they managed to build a network of 2,000 farmers. In 2000, just as they were beginning to plan their expansion to other states, then Andhra Pradesh Chief Minister Chandrababu Naidu took notice and invited them to implement the contract farming model in the state. They started from Kuppam, Chittoor, and from there, steadily added a new state or two every year. Today, they work in 17 states with 22,000 farmers.

He says,

None of this was easy, of course. Setting up in new states isn't easy. This growth phase was one of the most difficult periods for the company. They faced a lot of resistance from middlemen in several states. But, they overcame them due to their farmers’ support. In educated, middle-class homes, families often discourage young people from starting out on their own. In the many management colleges that he was lectured in the past few years.

Says to students,

In April 2012, Suguna Poultry was re-branded as Suguna Foods. A shift that Soundararajan says was inevitable as  the company were moved into livestock, aqua-feed and retail outlets. There were no dedicated poultry institutes in the country. They are start a poultry college in Udumalpet near Coimbatore in 2012. The institute will train persons who've completed high school with technical skills required by the industry and create the layer between farmers and marketing staff on the ground level. Above 7,000 people are required in this role every year, who can manage supply of chicks, feeds, vaccines to the farmers, ensure the farmers follow all quality measures and collect the grown chicks from them. Suguna has above 5,500 technical support staff in incubation and feeding sections.

From a small village in Tamil Nadu, Soundararajan Bangarusamy and his brother have come a long way in setting up their poultry business. It began innocuously enough with Soundararajan's father urging him to begin a business of his own right after high school, and his mother giving him Rs 5,000 as initial seed capital. Today, Suguna is a leading poultry, poultry vaccine manufacturing and poultry nutrition company. It's also credited for popularizing the concept of contract farming in Indian poultry. Suguna works with 22,000 farmers in 17 states across India, and also has operations in Bangladesh, Sri Lanka and Kenya.

Board memberships

Awards and honors

Personal life 

Soundararajan is married to Vasantha Mani and has two children, Aarthi Soundararajan and Vignesh Soundararajan both are married. They live in Coimbatore.

References 

1961 births
Living people